Broken Vow is a 2012 Philippine television drama mystery series broadcast by GMA Network. Directed by Gil Tejada Jr., it stars Bianca King, Luis Alandy, Gabby Eigenmann and Rochelle Pangilinan. It premiered on February 6, 2012 on the network's Afternoon Prime line up replacing Kung Aagawin Mo ang Langit. The series concluded on June 15, 2012 with a total of 93 episodes. It was replaced by Faithfully in its timeslot.

Cast and characters
Lead cast
 Bianca King as Melissa Santiago
 Luis Alandy as Felix Rastro
 Gabby Eigenmann as Roberto Sebastian
 Rochelle Pangilinan as Rebecca Sta. Maria

Supporting cast
 Celia Rodriguez as Ofelia "Amorcita" Rastro
 Juan Rodrigo as Lucio Sebastian
 Carmi Martin as Rosanna Sebastian
 Melissa Mendez as Amor Santiago
 Ervic Vijandre as David Sebastian-Sta. Maria
 Marco Alcaraz as Michael Pascual
 Matet de Leon as Amy
 Jace Flores as Kenneth
 Lou Sison as Sheila
 Pancho Magno as Rico
 Kryshee Grengia as Eva Marie Santiago

Guest cast
 Ehra Madrigal as Rachel
 Jenine Desiderio as Jenny
 Dominic Roco as Wilson Ocampo
 Kylie Padilla as Jenna Rastro-Santiago 
 Tonio Quiazon as Bryan Perez
 Menggie Cobarubias as Mario Jimeno
 Divina Valencia as Digina
 Vaness del Moral as Ellen
 Joyce Ching as Malou
 Bodjie Pascua as Enrico
 Robert Ortega as Erwin

Ratings
According to AGB Nielsen Philippines' Mega Manila household television ratings, the pilot episode of Broken Vow earned a 16.3% rating. While the final episode scored a 26.7% rating.

References

External links
 

2012 Philippine television series debuts
2012 Philippine television series endings
Filipino-language television shows
GMA Network drama series
Television shows set in Rio de Janeiro (city)
Television shows set in the Philippines